Profile was an American talk show hosted by Audie Cornish that premiered on July 22, 2018, on Facebook Watch.

Premise
Each episode of Profile featured "a different newsmaker each week, giving viewers a chance to hear from the biggest names in politics, tech, business, and entertainment."

Production
On July 10, 2018, it was announced that Facebook, through the news division of Facebook Watch, had partnered with Buzzfeed News on a weekly interview series titled Profile. The series was set to be hosted by Audie Cornish and executive produced by Tracey Eyers, BuzzFeed News vice-president of news and programming Shani Hilton, and BuzzFeed News head of programming Cindy Vanegas-Gesuale.

Episodes

References

External links

English-language television shows
Facebook Watch original programming
2010s American television talk shows
2018 American television series debuts